The Great Food Race is a New Zealand competitive reality television cooking show.
It premiered on 2 February 2014 on TV3. The show is hosted by Australian Zoe Marshall and is judged by brothers Leonardo and Lorenzo Bresolin.

The series is similar to and a mixture of the format of MasterChef New Zealand and The Amazing Race whereby contestants compete in weekly elimination challenges while  travelling New Zealand (and in a later leg, internationally).

Series overview

References

External links
 Tv3.co.nz

2014 New Zealand television series debuts
2014 New Zealand television series endings
English-language television shows
New Zealand cooking television series
Three (TV channel) original programming